Time to Kill may refer to:

Film and fiction
A Time to Kill (Grisham novel), a 1988 legal novel by John Grisham
A Time to Kill (1996 film), a feature film adaptation of Grisham's novel
Tempo di uccidere (Time to Kill), a novel by Ennio Flaiano
Time to Kill (1989 film), a film based on the novel starring Nicolas Cage
A Time to Kill (TNG novel), a 2004 novel by David Mack set in the fictional universe of Star Trek: The Next Generation
Time to Kill (1942 film), an adaptation of Raymond Chandler's novel The High Window
Time to Kill (short film), a 1945 short film starring Betty White
A Time to Kill (1955 film), a British crime film starring John Le Mesurier
Time to Kill, a working title of Bangkok Dangerous, directed by the Pang brothers and starring Nicolas Cage

Music
"Time to Kill" (song), a song on the 1970 album Stage Fright by The Band
"Time to Kill", a song on the 1975 album Free Hand by Gentle Giant
"Time to Kill", a song on the 1977 album U.K. by UK
"Time to Kill", a song on the 1987 album Raise Your Fist and Yell by Alice Cooper
"Time to Kill", a song on the 1989 album The Years of Decay by Overkill
"Time to Kill", a song on the 1993 album The Battle Rages On... by Deep Purple
Time to Kill, a 1999 album by Sophie Zelmani
A Time to Kill (soundtrack), for the 1996 film A Time to Kill

Other
 Duke Nukem: Time to Kill, a 1998 video game
 Time to kill, video game term

See also
A Time to Kill, a book title taken from literature